A Long Road Home is the 2002 concept album by singer-songwriter Mickey Newbury, released on his Mountain Retreat label.  The album was recorded while Newbury was receiving full-time oxygen treatments for emphysema.  The concept album is notable for its two ten-minute plus songs "In '59" and "A Long Road Home," new songs "Where Are You Darlin' Tonight" and "So Sad," and a new version of "Here Comes The Rain, Baby" one of Newbury's early songwriting successes (a hit for Eddy Arnold) that he first recorded for his debut Harlequin Melodies.  This was the last studio album Newbury released in his lifetime.

Track listing 
All songs written by Mickey Newbury
"In '59" – 11:20
"I Don't Love You" – 2:05
"The Last Question (In The Dead Of The Night)" – 5:57
"Here Comes The Rain, Baby" - 3:03
"One More Song Of Hearts And Flowers" – 5:40
"A Moment With Heather" – 0:34
"Where Are You Darlin' Tonight" – 4:43
"So Sad" – 6:00
"Maybe" – 4:33
"A Long Road Home" – 10:01
"116 Westfield Street" – 5:22

Personnel 
 John Catchings – cello
 Vic Clay – acoustic guitar
 David Davidson – violin
 Bill Graham (strings musician) – fiddle, mandolin
 David Hoffner – synthesizer
 David Huntsinger – piano
 Liza Martin – background vocals
 Matt McKenzie – electric bass, upright bass
 Craig Nelson – upright bass
 Mickey Newbury – guitar, sound effects, vocals
 Jack Williams – guitar

Credits 
 Martin Hall – engineer
 Owsley Manier – graphic design, design
 Michael McDonald – sound effects, mastering, post production
 Robert Rosemurgy – executive producer
 Paula Wolak – producer, engineer, mixing

References

External links 
 No Depression
 Mickey Newbury

Mickey Newbury albums
2002 albums